Mario Lessard (born June 25, 1954) is a Canadian former professional ice hockey goaltender.

Born in East Broughton, Quebec, Lessard began his National Hockey League career with the Los Angeles Kings in 1978, the team he would play his entire NHL career with. Lessard recorded four shutouts in 1978-79, tied for second best in the league. Lessard also was a NHL second team All-Star in 1981 and appeared in the 1981 NHL All-Star Game.

Lessard may be best known as the Kings goalie in the Miracle on Manchester playoff game in April 1982 in which the Kings rallied from a 5-0 deficit to beat the Edmonton Oilers, 6-5 in overtime. Early in overtime of that game, Lessard mishandled the puck 40 feet in front of his net as he attempted to beat Glenn Anderson to the puck and stop a breakaway; with the net wide open and defenceman Mark Hardy trying to act as goalie, the Oilers Mark Messier shot the puck over the open net. The Kings scored two minutes later to win.  After the game Lessard lamented that his mistake nearly blew the amazing comeback. He retired after the 1984 season.

Career statistics

Regular season and playoffs

External links

Mario Lessard: Training Inspiration

1954 births
Birmingham South Stars players
Canadian ice hockey goaltenders
Fort Worth Texans players
French Quebecers
Ice hockey people from Quebec
Living people
Los Angeles Kings draft picks
Los Angeles Kings players
National Hockey League All-Stars
New Haven Nighthawks players
Quebec Nordiques (WHA) draft picks
Saginaw Gears players
Sherbrooke Castors players
Springfield Indians players